This is a list of places on the Victorian Heritage Register in the Rural City of Horsham in Victoria, Australia. The Victorian Heritage Register is maintained by the Heritage Council of Victoria.

The Victorian Heritage Register, as of 2020, lists the following seven state-registered places within the Rural City of Horsham:

References

Horsham
Rural City of Horsham